The Provisional Workers-Peasants Government of Ukraine was a provisional Soviet government created on November 28, 1918, in Kursk on decision of the Communist Party of Ukraine and help of the Russian Workers-Peasants Red Army (RKKA), with its place of location was assigned the city of Sudzha (today in Kursk Oblast). On the same day the government released its manifest. This Soviet government was created in the very same way as the Provisional Workers' and Peasants' Government of Belorussia which on 1 January 1919 also issued its manifest in Minsk. The Provisional Workers-Peasants Government of Ukraine became the highest legislative, executive and administrative body of Soviet power in Ukraine as the Soviet Russia resumed hostilities against Ukraine.

All-Ukrainian Central Military Revolutionary Committee

Since July 1918 Bolsheviks were preparing the uprising against Ukrainian government and occupation of Ukraine by the Central powers.

At the Party Congress of the Communist Party of Ukraine that took place on July 5–12, 1918 in Moscow and adapted the party's resolution "About Armed Uprising", it was decided to create the All-Ukrainian Central Military-Revolutionary Committee (Milrevkom). The Milrevkom was located in Kursk and consisted from members of the Insurgency Bureau of the former Bolshevik government of Ukraine. Among its members were Andrei Bubnov (leader), Volodymyr Zatonsky, Vladimir Aussem, Yuri Kotsyubynsky, and Yuri Pyatakov.

Eager to resume open hostilities on August 5, 1918, the Milrevkom issued erroneous Order No.1 about general uprising in Ukraine which was not yet prepared. Next month under direction of the Communist Party of Ukraine formed the 1st and 2nd Ukrainian Soviet divisions.

The strike force of the government became the two Ukrainian insurgent divisions that were created in August 1918 by the All-Ukrainian Central Military-Revolutionary Committee. In Soviet historiography the committee was categorized as a leading organ of fighting for freedom of working masses of Ukraine against the Austria-Germany occupation forces and the bourgeois-land owners regime of Hetman of Ukraine. The Central Military-Revolutionary Committee was created in July 1918 at the First Congress of the Communist Party of Ukraine that took place in Moscow. The leader of the committee was Andrei Bubnov. The committee was also in charge of underground revolutionary committees and partizan formations. On August 5, 1918, it issued its Order #1 About the nationwide uprising in Ukraine. The committee was dissolved already after four months in November 1918 when the Soviet forces established the Provisional Government of Ukraine.

After annulment of the Treaty of Brest-Litovsk on November 17, 1918, the Sovnarkom of the Soviet Russia gave an order on organization of the Revolutionary Military Council at the Kursk Direction Army Group that included Vladimir Antonov-Ovseyenko, Volodymyr Zatonsky and Joseph Stalin, while the commander of the task force was Vladimir Antonov-Ovseyenko. After the creation of the government, Joseph Stalin was later replaced by Fyodor Sergeyev.

Provisional Government of Ukraine
The main goal of the government was to accomplish the Socialist Revolution with the motto "All power to Soviets". On January 6, 1919, the government declared the Ukrainian Socialist Soviet Republic, abbreviated UkrSSR. On January 16, 1919, the government fired its chairman Yuri Pyatakov and elected Fyodor Sergeyev as his successor. On January 28, 1919, the provisional government was replaced by the All-Ukrainian Council of People's Commissars represented by the First Rakovsky Government. The 3rd All-Ukrainian Congress of Soviets (March 6–10, 1919) approved the new government as the Council of People's Commissars by adopting the Constitution of the UkrSSR.

Composition
Government in Sudzha
 Military Department - Fyodor Sergeyev (later - M.Rukhimovich)
 Interior Department - Vasily Averin
 Department of People's Economy and Finance - Emmanuel Kviring
 Foreign Affairs Department - Vlasenko
 Commissar of Railroads - Zharko
 Administration - Kudrin
 Foreign propaganda - Žanis Bļumbergs
 Treasury - Vashchenko
 Secretary - Granovsky
 Military Council (Kursk) - Sergeyev, Zatonsky, Antonov
 Delegation to the Military Council of Defense - Pyatakov and Sergeyev
 Negotiations with Germany delegation - Zatonsky

External links
 Rogozhin, A. Military construction in Ukraine during the Civil War and foreign military intervention. "Yuridicheskaya Rossiya".
 All-Ukrainian Central Military-Revolutionary Committee. Ukrainian Soviet Encyclopedia.
 All-Ukrainian Central Military-Revolutionary Committee. Jurist Encyclopedia (Ukraine)
 Provisional Workers-Peasants Government of Ukraine. Jurist Encyclopedia (Ukraine).
 Provisional Workers-Peasants Government of Ukraine. Ukrainian Soviet Encyclopedia.
 Official government documents. Governmental portal of Ukraine.
 Establishment of the Ukrainian Soviet State and Law
 Ivan Terlyuk. Creation of extra-constitutional mechanism of state administration in the Soviet Ukraine. History of State and Law of Ukraine (Історія держави і права України).

Political history of Ukraine
Government of Ukraine
Ukrainian governments
1918 in Ukraine
1919 in Ukraine
Communist Party of Ukraine (Soviet Union)
1918 establishments in Ukraine
1919 disestablishments in Ukraine
Provisional governments